New Hope for the Wretched is the debut studio album by American punk rock band Plasmatics. It was released on October 2, 1980 by Stiff Records.

Jimmy Miller, former producer of the Rolling Stones and Motörhead (a band Plasmatics would collaborate with in the future), was the initial producer for the album. He had a heroin addiction from the day he arrived in New York City and he was virtually useless to the project, nearly bringing the whole project down with him. Stiff Records fired Miller, and the album was finished by engineer Ed Stasium and manager Rod Swenson over in England. In addition to songs like "Corruption" and "Living Dead", linked to TV smashing and automobile destruction, the song "Butcher Baby" featured, as with the live shows, a chainsaw sawing through a guitar in place of a guitar solo. Stiff released it as single and it peaked at No. 55 on the UK Singles Chart, with the album reaching the same position on the UK Albums Chart.

The liner notes for the record proudly proclaimed that during the recording of the cover of "Dream Lover" (originally by Bobby Darin) the musicians were isolated from each other while recording and, during the instrumental break, could not hear what each other were playing.

The album was re-released in 2001 by Plasmatics Media, Inc. with bonus tracks and the Metal Priestess EP on the same disc. In 2002, Cherry Red Records re-released the complete album. In 2014, Let Them Eat Viny] re-released the album (including the 2002 CD bonus tracks) as two coloured discs.

Reception 

New Hope for the Wretched would become the Plasmatics' most successful album, charting for 10 weeks and peaking at 134 on the Billboard 200 in 1981, a few months before the release of their follow-up album, Beyond the Valley of 1984. The album proved a bigger success in the U.K., peaking at 55 in November 1980.

Track listing

Personnel 
Plasmatics
 Wendy O. Williams – vocals, saxophone, chainsaw, machine gun
 Richie Stotts – lead guitar
 Wes Beech – rhythm guitar
 Jean Beauvoir – bass guitar
 Stu Deutsch – drums, synthdrums

Production
 Jimmy Miller – producer, percussion
 Ed Stasium – producer, engineer, mixing
 Rod Swenson – producer, management, mixing
 Trevor Hallsey – engineer

Charts

References

External links 
 [ New Hope for the Wretched] at AllMusic
 

1980 debut albums
Plasmatics albums
Albums produced by Jimmy Miller
Stiff Records albums
Albums produced by Ed Stasium